In certain ranked-voting systems, a first-preference vote (or first preference, 1st preference, or primary vote) is the individual voter's first choice amongst (possibly) many. In certain ranked systems such as Instant-Runoff Voting or Single Transferable Vote, the first-preference for candidate(s)/option(s) are initially counted, and then, if necessary, this criterion is altered to allow for proportionality, and to carry surplus and/or ineffective votes to second and subsequent options depending on the system involved.

Ballots with no clear first preference (no preference, or multiple first preferences) are generally regarded as a spoilt vote. The term is also used (trivially) in first past the post systems. First-preference votes are used by psephologists and the print and broadcast media to broadly describe the state of the parties at elections and the swing between elections. The term is much-used in Australian politics, where ranked voting has been universal at federal, state, and local levels since the 1920s.

References

Non-monotonic electoral systems
Preferential electoral systems
Proportional representation electoral systems
Single-winner electoral systems